David Anderson (24 January 1940 – 17 June 2005) was an Australian cricketer. He played 37 first-class cricket matches for Victoria between 1961 and 1969.

See also
 List of Victoria first-class cricketers

References

External links
 

1940 births
2005 deaths
Australian cricketers
Victoria cricketers
People from Warrnambool